RTAS may refer to:

 Real Time AudioSuite, an audio plug-in format developed by Digidesign
 Run-Time Abstraction Services, a firmware abstraction layer used on some computers
 Rayman: The Animated Series, a 1999 kid's show